Pănet is a commune in Mureș County, Transylvania, Romania composed of five villages:
Berghia / Mezőbergenye
Cuieșd / Székelykövesd
Hărțău / Harcó
Pănet
Sântioana de Mureș / Csittszentiván

Demographics

The commune has an absolute Székely Hungarian majority. According to the 2011 census, it has a population of 6033, of which 78.7% are Hungarian; 12.4% are Romanian and 8.9% Roma.

See also 
 List of Hungarian exonyms (Mureș County)

References

Communes in Mureș County
Localities in Transylvania